Peter Anthony Quinn (May 10, 1904 – December 23, 1974) of New York City was a Democratic U.S. Representative from New York from 1945 to 1947.  Quinn was a justice of the New York Supreme Court from 1955 to 1974.

Biography
Peter A. Quinn was born in New York City on May 10, 1904.  He attended the St. Brigid’s and St. Raymond’s School, and graduated from Manhattan Preparatory School in 1922. He graduated from Manhattan College in 1926; and from Fordham University School of Law in 1929. He was admitted to the bar in 1931, and practiced in New York City.

Political career 
Quinn was a member of the New York State Assembly (Bronx Co., 6th D.) from 1936 to 1944.

Congress 
He was elected as a Democrat to the 79th United States Congress, holding office from January 3, 1945, to January 3, 1947. He ran unsuccessfully for reelection in 1946 and resumed his law practice.

In January 1949, Quinn became a Judge on New York City's Municipal Court. From 1955 to 1960 he was a Judge on the City Court, and Chief Judge beginning in 1957. In 1960, Quinn was elected a justice of the New York Supreme Court, and remained on the bench until his death.

Death 
Quinn died on December 23, 1974, in the Bronx; and was buried at St. Joseph’s Cemetery in Hackensack, New Jersey.

Family 
His son Peter Quinn is an author whose works include 2007's Looking for Jimmy: A Search for Irish America.

References

New York Times, P.A. Quinn Inducted as Justice, January 11, 1949
New York Times, Bronx Justice Elected As Chief of City Court, March 19, 1957
New York Times, Justice Peter A. Quinn, 14 Years On State Supreme Court, Dead, December 24, 1974
Peter Quinn, Looking for Jimmy: A Search for Irish America, 2007

1904 births
1974 deaths
Democratic Party members of the New York State Assembly
New York Supreme Court Justices
Manhattan College alumni
Fordham University School of Law alumni
Democratic Party members of the United States House of Representatives from New York (state)
20th-century American politicians
20th-century American judges
Politicians from the Bronx